Giampiero (often Gianpiero or Gian Piero) is an Italian male given name.

List of people

Giampiero
Giampiero Albertini, Italian actor
Giampiero Artegiani, Italian singer
Giampiero Boniperti, Italian footballer
Giampiero Catone, Italian  politician
Giampiero de Carli, Italian rugby player
Giampiero Galeazzi, Italian rower
Giampiero Pastore, Italian fencer
Giampiero Pinzi, Italian footballer
Giampiero Simoni, Italian racing driver

Gianpiero
Gianpiero Combi, Italian footballer
Gianpiero D'Alia, Italian politician
Gianpiero Fiorani, Italian banker
Gianpiero Marini, Italian footballer
Gianpiero Moretti, Italian racing driver

Gian Piero
Gian Pietro Brogiolo, Italian professor
Gian Pietro Felisatti, Italian music producer
Gian Pietro Ferretti, Italian bishop
Gian Piero Gasperini, Italian footballer and manager
Gian Piero Ghio, Italian footballer and manager
Gian-Piero Meade, Italian cricketer
Gian Piero Reverberi, Italian composer
Gian-Piero Ringel, German film producer
Gian Piero Ventura, Italian football manager

Italian masculine given names